Ataköy—Şirinevler is a station on the M1 line of the Istanbul Metro in Bakırköy, Istanbul. Connection to the Istanbul Metrobus is available. This station is terminal station for temporary.

Ataköy—Şirinevler was opened on 25 July 1995.

Layout

References

Railway stations opened in 1995
1995 establishments in Turkey
Istanbul metro stations
Bakırköy